Samuel Maxwell (born 17 October 1988) is an English professional boxer who has held the British and Commonwealth light-welterweight titles since August 2021. As an amateur he won a bronze medal at the 2014 Commonwealth Games.

Amateur career
Maxwell started boxing aged 11 at the local Higher Side gym, and went on to join the Solly amateur gym in Liverpool going on to win the ABA Championships. He represented Great Britain from 2012 to 2016 and competed for the British Lionhearts squad at the 2015 World Series of Boxing competition (WSB). He boxed Vasyl Lomachenko twice during the WSB. His wins included Morocco, Algeria, Germany, Kazakhstan and China. He won a bronze at the 2014 Commonwealth Games and finished his amateur career in 2016.

Professional career
Maxwell made his professional debut on 7 October 2016, scoring a four-round points decision (PTS) victory over Ibrar Riyaz at the Greenbanks Sports Academy in Liverpool.  

After compiling a record of 10–0 (8 KOs) he faced Sabri Sediri for the vacant WBO European light-welterweight title on 23 March 2019 at the Leicester Arena. In the final minute of the contest Sediri began showboating, dancing around the ring with his hands down by his side. With less than 15 seconds to go and his opponent still neglecting his defence, Maxwell landed a solid right hand to leave Sediri sprawled out on the canvas. He was able to get back to his feet before the referee's count of ten but immediately stumbled on unsteady legs, prompting the referee to call a halt to the contest with seconds left in the round, awarding Maxwell a tenth-round technical knockout (TKO) and the WBO European title. After a second-round knockout (KO) win over Oscar Amador in a six-round non-title fight in July, Maxwell retained his title against Connor Parker with a seventh-round TKO in November.

Personal life
Maxwell was born in Hackney, London. 
Maxwell moved to Prescot, Knowsley in 1997 following the unexpected death of his father.

Professional boxing record

References

External links
 

1988 births
Living people
Commonwealth Games bronze medallists for England
Boxers at the 2014 Commonwealth Games
English male boxers
Commonwealth Games medallists in boxing
People from the London Borough of Hackney
Boxers from Greater London
Light-welterweight boxers
People from Prescot
European Games competitors for Great Britain
Boxers at the 2015 European Games
Boxers from Liverpool
Medallists at the 2014 Commonwealth Games